Hans-Peter Hannighofer (born 17 October 1997) is a German bobsledder.

He won a bronze medal at the IBSF World Championships 2021 in the two-man event.

References

External links
 
 
 Hans Peter Hannighofer at the German Bobsleigh, Luge, and Skeleton Federation 

1997 births
Living people
German male bobsledders